The 2nd Alabama Cavalry Regiment was a cavalry regiment of the Confederate States Army during the American Civil War.

Service
The 2nd Alabama Cavalry Regiment was organized at Montgomery, May 1, 1862. Proceeding to west Florida, it operated there about ten months and was engaged in several skirmishes. Ordered to north Mississippi, and placed under Gen. Ruggles, the regiment lost 8 men in a skirmish at Mud creek. It was then placed in Ferguson's brigade, and operated in the Tennessee Valley, taking part in numerous skirmishes. The Second fought Grierson at Okalona, with a loss of about 70 men killed and wounded, then harassed Sherman on his march to and from Mississippi. Joining Gen. Wheeler, the Second performed arduous duty on the flank of the army in the Dalton-Atlanta campaign, and lost a number of men in the battle of July 22 at Atlanta. Having accompanied Hood to Rome, the Second then fell on Sherman's rear and skirmished almost daily with some loss. The regiment tracked Sherman to Greensboro, North Carolina, then escorted President Davis to Georgia. 

The regiment surrendered at Forsyth, Georgia. At the end of their service, the regiment mustered about 450 men.

Commanders

Colonels -- F. W Hunter of Montgomery; relieved. R. Gordon Earle of Calhoun; killed at Kingston, Ga. John N. Carpenter of Greene.

Lieut. Colonels -- James Cunningham of Monroe; resigned. John P. West of Shelby; resigned. J. N. Carpenter; promoted. Jos. J. Pegues of Tuskaloosa; wounded at Nickajack.

Majors -- Mathew R. Marks of Montgomery; relieved. J. N. Carpenter; promoted. J. J. Pegues; promoted. Richard W. Carter of Butler.

Adjutants -- James M. Bullock of Greene.

Counties that supplied men to the unit and their commanders
Calhoun -- Richard G. Earl; promoted to colonel. Jacob W. Whisenhant; wounded at Kennesa.

Shelby -- John P. West; promoted to lieutenant colonel. Frank King.

Greene -- John N. Carpenter; promoted. James A. Anderson; wounded at Nickajack.

Tuskaloosa -- J. J. Pegues; promoted. James Eddins.

Butler -- R. W. Carter; promoted. Joseph Allen.

Montgomery -- Wm. L. Allen; died in the service. Bethel J. Bonham.

Coosa -- Wm. P. Ashley; wounded at Decatur, Ga.

Monroe -- Jas. H. McCreary; resigned. F. E. Richardson.

Montgomery and Dallas -- Felix Glackmeyer; resigned. A. N. McIver; resigned. Walter H. Daniel.

Montgomery -- Thomas R. Stacey; resigned. A. P. Wilson.

Wilcox -- Kindred Partin -- Courier 2nd Cav

See also
Alabama Civil War Confederate Units
Alabama in the American Civil War

References
The Civil War Archive - Confederate Alabama Cavalry

Units and formations of the Confederate States Army from Alabama
1862 establishments in Alabama
Military units and formations established in 1862